

Johann Sinnhuber (27 March 1887  – 23 October 1979) was a German general in the Wehrmacht during World War II who commanded the LXXXII Army Corps. He was a recipient of the Knight's Cross of the Iron Cross.

Awards and decorations

 Knight's Cross of the Iron Cross on 5 July 1941 as Generalleutnant and commander of 28.  Infanterie-Division

References

Citations

Bibliography

 

1887 births
1979 deaths
German Army generals of World War II
Generals of Artillery (Wehrmacht)
German Army personnel of World War I
Prussian Army personnel
Recipients of the Gold German Cross
Recipients of the Knight's Cross of the Iron Cross
People from East Prussia
Reichswehr personnel
People from Kaliningrad Oblast
Recipients of the clasp to the Iron Cross, 1st class